Stephan Hay is a State Representative who represents the 3rd Worcester District in the Massachusetts House of Representatives. He represents the towns of Fitchburg and Lunenburg. Hay serves as the Vice Chair of the Joint Committee on Labor and Workforce Development, and as a member on the Joint Committee on Higher Education, the Joint Committee on Public Safety and Homeland Security, and the Joint Committee on Revenue.  Prior to his election to the state government, he served on the Fitchburg City Council for 18 years.

See also
 2019–2020 Massachusetts legislature

References

Living people
21st-century American politicians
Democratic Party members of the Massachusetts House of Representatives
Clark University alumni
Rutgers University alumni
Year of birth missing (living people)